was a Japanese film director and screenwriter. He directed more than thirty films and is best known for his film The Street Fighter. He directed in over 110 films between 1954 and 1976.

Selected filmography
 Kunisada Chūji (1958)
 The Valiant Red Peony Pt.4 (1969)
 Kizudarakeno Jinsei (1971)
 The Street Fighter (1974)
 Return of the Street Fighter (1974)
 The Street Fighter's Last Revenge (1974)
 Sister Street Fighter – Fifth Level Fist (1976)

References

External links
 

1922 births
2004 deaths
People from Nagano (city)
Japanese film directors